Leslie Godfree and Randolph Lycett were the defending champions, but lost in the semifinals to Watson Washburn and R. Norris Williams.

Frank Hunter and Vincent Richards and defeated Washburn and Williams in the final, 6–3, 3–6, 8–10, 8–6, 6–3 to win the gentlemen's doubles tennis title at the 1924 Wimbledon Championships.

Draw

Finals

Top half

Section 1

Section 2

The nationality of KD Fairley is unknown.

Bottom half

Section 3

The nationality of BL Cameron is unknown.

Section 4

References

External links

Men's Doubles
Wimbledon Championship by year – Men's doubles